Phenylmethanediol is an organic compound that is a geminal diol, the hydrate of benzaldehyde.  It is a short-lived intermediate in some chemical reactions, such as oxidations of toluene and benzaldehyde and the reduction of benzoic acid.

References

Geminal diols
Benzyl compounds